Osredek pri Trški Gori is a small settlement in the hills above the right bank of the Sava River, beyond Trška Gora in the Municipality of Krško in eastern Slovenia. The area is part of the traditional region of Lower Carniola. It is now included with the rest of the municipality in the Lower Sava Statistical Region.

Name
The name of the settlement was changed from Osredek to Osredek pri Trški Gori in 1955.

References

External links
Osredek pri Trški Gori on Geopedia

Populated places in the Municipality of Krško